was an appeal on formalities in English law. The final, registration stage of a witnessed deed of transfer (of land) is not imperative in all circumstances, the court confirmed.  Those circumstances include that there must be no detriment to a third party bona fide purchaser or mortgagee for value without notice; and there must be no fraud or abuse of trust as defined by law.  It has wider resonance with the formalities of Trusts in English law.

Facts
A father wished to transfer (at an undervalue) land to his son. He made and gave him an executed deed of transfer (and as further show of intent the land certificate). Then they fell out, and the father changed his mind. The son had not yet gone through with the registration at HM Land Registry as the Stamp Office wrongly rejected the transfer, namely sending it to the father who was the party but not the applicant. The father argued that it was still his property.

Judgment
Argument on consideration (value or not passed in exchange for the property):

The judge treated it as common ground the father had no expectation to get £9,000: there was no evidence to that effect. At appeal it was ruled the contrary argument was barred, given the "receipt" for the £9,000 in the transfer deed. Moreover, the evidence showed quite clearly that it was explained to the plaintiff/appellant, the father, before the transaction was carried through that it was being carried through on the basis that he was treated as having received £9,000...it was simply not open to the father, in those circumstances, to raise the question of non payment.

Remaining substantive arguments:
Lawton LJ and Browne-Wilkinson LJ gave concurring judgments, upholding the court below, that the property belonged to the son in equity, and was held on trust for the son by the father, because the father had done everything in his power to make the transfer effective. Although without registration, legal title had not passed, title had passed in equity and the father could not take back his agreement.

Sir Denys Buckley concurred.

See also

English trust law

References

English trusts case law
Court of Appeal (England and Wales) cases
1984 in case law
1984 in British law